Kevin Bryant Mathis (born April 29, 1974) is a former American football cornerback in the National Football League (NFL) for the Dallas Cowboys, New Orleans Saints, and Atlanta Falcons. He played college football at Texas A&M University–Commerce.

Early years
Mathis was born in Gainesville, Texas, and attended Gainesville High School, where he lettered in football, basketball, and track. In football, he was a two-time All-District selection.

He accepted a football scholarship from Texas A&M University-Commerce. As a redshirt freshman, he was a backup cornerback, tallying 64 tackles, 3 interceptions, 11 passes defensed and 4 fumble recoveries. As a sophomore he was named a starter at cornerback, registering 57 tackles, 3 interceptions, 13 passes defensed and 3 forced fumbles

As a junior, he collected 55 tackles, 6 interceptions and 16 passes defensed, while having 26 punt returns for a 10.4-yard average and 11 kickoff returns for a 24.6-yard average.

As a senior, he recorded 48 tackles (2 for loss), 4 interceptions, 17 passes defensed and one sack. He led the team with 16 punt returns for a 9.7-yard average and 15 kickoff returns for a 24.9-yard average.

In 2009, he was inducted into the Texas A&M-Commerce Athletic Hall of Fame.

Professional career

Dallas Cowboys
Mathis was signed as an undrafted free agent by the Dallas Cowboys after the 1997 NFL Draft, after dropping because of his size and small college background. He would end up making the team after taking advantage of Deion Sanders being away while playing professional baseball and displaying his track speed (4.19 seconds in the 40-yard dash). As a rookie, he played in all 16 games, recorded 23 tackles, 5 passes defensed, one forced fumble, one fumble recovery, 12 special teams tackles and also returned punts. He started the final 3 contests at right cornerback, following Sanders' season ending rib fracture injury.

In 1998, he was moved to the left side to backup Kevin Smith. At the end of the season, he passed an injured Smith on the depth chart, starting the final 4 games of the season and the wild card playoff loss against the Arizona Cardinals. He also established himself as one of the more productive kickoff returners in the league, averaging 24.8 yards to finish ranked sixth in the NFC. He posted 41 tackles, 2 interceptions, 8 passes defensed, one forced fumble, 2 fumble recoveries and special teams tackles. He missed 3 games with a broken right forearm.

In 1999, he would miss 8 games because of knee and hamstring injuries. He had 4 starts, but was mostly a backup behind Smith and Charlie Williams.

In 2000, the Cowboys had a lot of turnover at linebacker and one of the moves made to improve the depth was trading Mathis to the New Orleans Saints in exchange for linebacker Chris Bordano on April 26. Also factoring in the decision was his injury history and the numbers at the cornerback position (signing of Ryan McNeil and 3 rookie cornerbacks draft selections).

New Orleans Saints
Mathis was named the starter at left cornerback for all 16 games in the 2000 season and finished with 87 tackles and 1 interception. He helped the New Orleans Saints reach the playoffs for the first time since 1992 and also win their first ever playoff game.

As a starter in the 2001 season, he injured his cervical spine while tackling the Washington Redskins' Ki-Jana Carter. On July 24, 2002, he was waived injured.

Atlanta Falcons
On September 17, 2002, Mathis was signed as a free agent by the Atlanta Falcons. He played 11 games in the nickel packages, registering a career-high 3 interceptions. He started 12 games in 2004, finishing with 67 tackles and 2 interceptions (both returned for touchdowns).

On September 13, 2005, he was lost for the season with a career-threatening left knee injury, after tearing 3 ligaments during a practice drill.

The next year, he returned to play but suffered a career-ending neck injury, while tackling Eddie Drummond on the opening kickoff against the Detroit Lions on November 5, 2006. He was released injured on April 9, 2007.

Coaching career
In 2012, he became a football assistant coach at Prime Prep Academy. In 2020 he joined Jackson State University as the defensive backs coach.

In December 2022, Mathis followed Sanders to the University of Colorado Boulder to be the defensive backs coach for the Colorado Buffaloes.

References

1974 births
Living people
People from Gainesville, Texas
Players of American football from Texas
American football cornerbacks
Texas A&M–Commerce Lions football players
Dallas Cowboys players
New Orleans Saints players
Atlanta Falcons players
High school football coaches in Texas
Jackson State Tigers football coaches
Colorado Buffaloes football coaches
Ed Block Courage Award recipients